Johan Tirén (12 October 1853, Själevad - 24 August 1911, Länna Parish, Uppland) was a Swedish painter who specialized in scenes of the rural life in Northern Sweden.

Biography
He was the older brother of the artist, . At the age of seven, his family moved to Oviken in Jämtland, where his father served as the Vicar. He originally attended the Tekniska skolan in Stockholm then spent the years 1877 to 1880 at the Royal Swedish Academy of Fine Arts, where he won a Royal Medal in 1880 for his painting of Loki imprisoned by Æsir. He first came to public attention when his painting, "A Jämtland Legend" was displayed at the Academy. His fellow student, Anders Zorn, sat as the model for the näck (water spirit). 

After studying in Norrland in 1881, he was able to obtain a scholarship and used it to make a study trip; visiting the Netherlands, Belgium, Paris and Upper Bavaria. While in Rome, he received orders from the Academy Director to begin studies in Munich. Instead, after spending the summer in Denmark, he returned to Paris and studied with  Jean-Léon Gérôme, but found himself uninspired to paint by what he saw there. When his travel allowance was not extended, he settled in Jämtland, where he painted landscapes and scenes from the lives of the Sami people. 

In 1884, he married the painter Gerda Rydberg. Their children, Nils and  also became artists.

He became deeply involved in the issue of rights for the Sami and, in 1892, painted a controversial scene showing them with some of their reindeer that had been shot by a farmer. It was inspired by a real incident involving a landowner named  of Ljusnedal who had instigated the slaughtering of reindeer belonging to the Sami so the area could be developed. 

Selected paintings

References

Other sources
 Tirén, Johan i Svenskt biografiskt handlexikon, 1906
 Biography from the Nordisk familjebok @ Project Runeberg
 Johan Tirén i Nationalencyklopedin

External links

More works by Tirén @ ArtNet
Works from the Jämtlands läns museums.

1853 births
1911 deaths
Swedish painters
Genre painters
People from Ångermanland